Ongaku no Kodomo wa Mina Utau (音楽の子供はみな歌う All You Musical Kids, Sing) is the fourth album of the Japanese rock band Sambomaster.

Track listing
 
 
 
 
 Very special!! (Album Version)
 
 
 
 
 
 
 
 I Love You (Album Version)

Sambomaster albums
2008 albums